The Tour d'Erbalunga is a ruined Genoese tower near Erbalunga located in the commune of Brando (Haute-Corse) on the east coast of the Cap Corse on the French island of Corsica.

A tower existed at Erbalunga in 1488. It was destroyed by French forces in their invasion of Corsica in 1553 and was then rebuilt when the French withdrew after the treaty of Cateau-Cambrésis. The tower was one of a series of coastal defences constructed by the Republic of Genoa between 1530 and 1620 to stem the attacks by Barbary pirates. In 1927 the tower was listed as one of the official historical monuments of France.

Notes and references

External links

 Includes information on how to reach 90 towers and many photographs.

Towers in Corsica
Monuments historiques of Corsica